Hall House or Hall Farm may refer to:

in the United States
(sorted by state, then city/town)

Goode-Hall House, Town Creek, Alabama, listed on the National Register of Historic Places (NRHP) in Alabama
Arthur C. and Helen Neel Hall House, Tucson, Arizona, listed on the NRHP in Pima County, Arizona
Lewis D.W. Hall House, Tucson, Arizona, listed on the NRHP in Pima County, Arizona
Fred Hall House, Kensett, Arkansas, NRHP-listed
Hall House (Little Rock, Arkansas), NRHP-listed
Charlie Hall House, Twin Groves, Arkansas, NRHP-listed
Hall House (Denver, Colorado), one of the oldest buildings in Colorado
Col. David Hall House, Lewes, Delaware, NRHP-listed
David Hall House, Lake Villa vicinity, Illinois, NRHP-listed
Hall Farm (Clunette, Indiana), NRHP-listed
Hall-Crull Octagonal House, Rushville, Indiana, NRHP-listed
Hannah Morse Fowler Hall House, Buchanan, Iowa, NRHP-listed
James Norman Hall House, Colfax, Iowa, NRHP-listed
Israel Hall House, Davenport, Iowa, NRHP-listed
Hall House (Bowling Green, Kentucky), listed on the NRHP in Warren County, Kentucky
Gov. Luther Hall House, Monroe, Louisiana, listed on the NRHP in Ouachita Parish, Louisiana
Hall House (Bethel, Maine), NRHP-listed
Enoch Hall House, Buckfield, Maine, NRHP-listed
Chapman-Hall House, Damariscotta, Maine, NRHP-listed
McWain-Hall House, Waterford, Maine, NRHP-listed
Edward Hall House, Arlington, Massachusetts, NRHP-listed
Isaac Hall House, Medford, Massachusetts, NRHP-listed
Stephen Hall House, Reading, Massachusetts, NRHP-listed
S. A. Hall House, Uxbridge, Massachusetts, NRHP-listed
Henry C. Hall House, Waltham, Massachusetts, NRHP-listed
Charles A. Hall Three-Decker, Worcester, Massachusetts, NRHP-listed
Dr. Leonard Hall House, Hudson, Michigan, NRHP-listed
Joseph E. Hall House (Tecumseh, Michigan), NRHP-listed
S. Edward Hall House, St. Paul, Minnesota, NRHP-listed
Hall-Henderson House, Sardis, Mississippi, listed on the NRHP in Panola County, Mississippi
Hall-Roberson House, Sardis, Mississippi, listed on the NRHP in Panola County, Mississippi
William P. Hall House, Lancaster, Missouri, NRHP-listed
Charles S. Hall House, Epsom, New Hampshire, NRHP-listed
Mauldin-Hall House, Artesia, New Mexico, NRHP-listed
Frank A. Hall House, Westfield, New York, NRHP-listed
Hall Family House, Bear Poplar, North Carolina, NRHP-listed
Hall Cabin, Fontana, North Carolina, NRHP-listed
Hall-London House, Pittsboro, North Carolina, NRHP-listed
Rev. Plummer T. Hall House, Raleigh, North Carolina, NRHP-listed
Josephus Hall House, Salisbury, North Carolina, NRHP-listed
Lucius Coleman Hall House, Webster, North Carolina, NRHP-listed
Ralph Hall Farm District, Carrington, North Dakota, NRHP-listed
Howard A. Hall House, Eugene, Oregon, NRHP-listed
Hall–Chaney House, Milwaukie, Oregon, NRHP-listed
Hazel Hall House, Portland, Oregon, NRHP-listed
Joseph E. Hall House (Brookville, Pennsylvania), NRHP-listed
Ainsley Hall House, Columbia, South Carolina, NRHP-listed
Alexander Doak Hall Farm, Kingsport, Tennessee, listed on the NRHP in Sullivan County, Tennessee
Boyd-Hall House, Abilene, Texas, listed on the NRHP in Taylor County, Texas
Hall-Sayers-Perkins House, Bastrop, Texas, listed on the NRHP in Bastrop County, Texas
Wallace-Hall House, Mansfield, Texas, listed on the NRHP in Tarrant County, Texas
R. A. Hall House, San Angelo, Texas, listed on the NRHP in Tom Green County, Texas
Robert Hall House, Seguin, Texas, NRHP-listed
Poulson-Hall House, Manti, Utah, listed on the NRHP in Sanpete County, Utah
Nels G. Hall House, Salt Lake City, Utah, listed on the NRHP in Salt Lake City, Utah
William A. Hall House, Rockingham, Vermont, NRHP-listed
Gen. Robinson Hall House, Wallingford, Vermont, NRHP-listed
Thomas Hall House, Childress, Virginia, NRHP-listed
Lewis Hall Mansion, Wellsburg, West Virginia, NRHP-listed
Samuel Hall House, Albion, Wisconsin, NRHP-listed
Chauncey Hall House, Racine, Wisconsin, NRHP-listed

See also
Joseph E. Hall House (disambiguation)